Adina Laura Meiroșu (former Fiera; born 11 August 1985, in Galaţi)  is a retired Romanian handballer.

She retired at the end of the 2012-13 season because of recurring knees injuries.

International honours 
EHF Champions League:
Finalist: 2010
Semifinalist: 2009, 2012, 2013
EHF Champions Trophy:
Winner: 2007
EHF Cup Winners' Cup:
Winner: 2007
Youth European Championship:
Silver Medalist: 2003
European Championship:
Bronze Medalist: 2010
Fifth Place: 2008
World Championship:
Fourth Place: 2007

References

External links 
 
 
 

1985 births
Living people
Romanian female handball players
Olympic handball players of Romania
Handball players at the 2008 Summer Olympics
SCM Râmnicu Vâlcea (handball) players
Sportspeople from Galați